Garden City Shopping Centre is a single-level shopping centre in Winnipeg, Manitoba, Canada, located at the intersection of McPhillips Street and Leila Avenue. Built in 1970, it was opened on August 12 that year.

Anchor stores include Canadian Tire, Winners and GoodLife Fitness. 

The shopping centre is owned and managed by RioCan Real Estate Investment Trust.

History 
The shopping centre was developed by James Kelly of Toronto. The centre was built in West Kildonan upon  of land. Upon construction in 1969–1970, at a cost of millions of dollars,  of space. The initial plan was for 40 stores. The T. Eaton Co. Limited also purchased space in the mall.

A major expansion began in 1974, with a   addition. Anchor stores at that time included the Simpson-Sears store and a Dominion supermarket, with plans to add an Eaton's store and a Beaver Lumber. T. Eaton Co. Limited opened an  store in August 1976. As of that same year, Garden City was one of the four largest regional malls in the city of Winnipeg.

The Eaton's store closed in 1998, and its space was taken over by a Canadian Tire store.

In Spring 2018, Garden City completed a $10-million renovation. The centre was enhanced with revitalized interiors, new seating, new bathrooms, revamped food court, and energy-efficient lighting throughout.

With Sears Canada having closed their operations due to nationwide bankruptcy, the space formerly occupied by them at the shopping centre has been redeveloped. The  area was divided into multiple units, and a lease has been signed with Seafood City Supermarket, a new-to-Winnipeg iconic Filipino-focused grocer, Michaels, and Bulk Barn.

References

External links 
 

Buildings and structures in Winnipeg
Shopping malls in Manitoba
Shopping malls established in 1970
1970 establishments in Manitoba
Seven Oaks, Winnipeg